San Pedro de Lloc District is one of five districts of the province Pacasmayo in Peru.

Localities
Some localities en San Pedro de Lloc district are:
Puémape
Masanca
Chocofán

References